WXOQ (105.5 FM, "The Worm Q105") was a radio station broadcasting a country music format. Licensed to Selmer, Tennessee, United States, the station was last owned by Gerald W. Hunt and featured programming from Citadel Media.

WXOQ's license was surrendered to the Federal Communications Commission and cancelled on April 15, 2022.

References

External links
 

Defunct radio stations in the United States
XOQ
Radio stations established in 1986
1986 establishments in Tennessee
Radio stations disestablished in 2022
2022 disestablishments in Tennessee
XOQ
McNairy County, Tennessee